Salu Digby, also known as Shrinking Violet, Violet, and Atom Girl, is a superhero appearing in DC Comics, primarily as a member of the Legion of Super-Heroes in the 30th and 31st centuries. She is from the planet Imsk and has the power to shrink to tiny size, as do all Imsk natives.

Publication history
Shrinking Violet first appeared in Action Comics #276, and was created by writer Jerry Siegel and artist Jim Mooney.

Fictional character biography

Zero Hour

Pre-Zero Hour
In the original pre-Zero Hour continuity, she was the thirteenth person to join the Legion of Super-Heroes. She first appeared in Action Comics #276 (1961). She tried out for membership at the same time as Sun Boy and Bouncing Boy. At that same tryout, Supergirl and Brainiac 5 joined the Legion. Shrinking Violet joined the Legion later, as did her fellow applicants Sun Boy and Bouncing Boy. Despite her shyness, Shrinking Violet, known as Vi to her teammates, served as an exemplary Legionnaire. She became romantically involved with Duplicate Boy of the Heroes of Lallor.

Years later, she was kidnapped by Imsk-native radicals. She was replaced in the Legion by Yera, a Durlan actress who used her native shapeshifting abilities to assume Violet's identity. Legion deputy leader Element Lad and Science Police liaison Shvaughn Erin became suspicious of the fake Violet when Yera, wearing Violet's form, suddenly fell in love with Colossal Boy, who harbored an unrequited crush on the real Violet for years. Yera's charade was exposed and the real Violet was rescued. After her recovery from the trauma of her abduction, Violet resumed her Legion career. More cynical in personality, she became decidedly aggressive in her dealings with criminals.  Eventually, she became the most skilled female Legionnaire in hand-to-hand combat (with the exception of Dream Girl).

After returning to active duty, Violet broke up with Duplicate Boy when she learned that, although he had discovered Yera's secret some months earlier, he had neither told anyone nor tried to rescue her. She later had a short-term romantic relationship with fellow Legionnaire Sun Boy. 

During the "Five Year Later" storyline, it was strongly implied (but never explicitly stated) that she entered into a lesbian romance with another teammate, Lightning Lass. After the Legion's disintegration in the aftermath of the Paul Levitz-written era, Violet returned to Imsk and was drafted to fight in a war against Braal, the home planet of her fellow Legionnaire Cosmic Boy. This ended with the "Battle of Venado Bay", during which she found herself saving a grievously-injured Cosmic Boy from her own comrades; he, delirious with pain, did not recognize her, and attacked her face, destroying her right eye and leaving her with a long scar along her face. The two later reconciled, and although she had her eye repaired, she chose to keep her scar as a reminder.

Before the Legion reboot, one of Violet's legs was disintegrated and subsequently replaced with an artificial one.

In the "Legion on the Run" storyline, she operated under the alias Virus, as Legion leader.

During the "Five Year Gap" following the Magic Wars, Earth fell under the covert control of the Dominators, and withdrew from the United Planets. A few years later, the members of the Dominators' highly classified "Batch SW6" escaped captivity. Originally, Batch SW6 appeared to be a group of teenage Legionnaire clones, created from samples apparently taken just prior to Ferro Lad's death at the hands of the Sun-Eater. Later, they were revealed to be time-paradox duplicates, every bit as legitimate as their older counterparts. After Earth was destroyed in a disaster reminiscent of the destruction of Krypton over a millennium earlier, a few dozen surviving cities and their inhabitants reconstituted their world as New Earth. The SW6 Legionnaires — including their version of Shrinking Violet — remained. The "Five Years Later" stories were erased from the mainstream when the continuity was reset by Zero Hour.

Post-Zero Hour

Violet originally joined the Legion (as Shrinking Violet). In the final competition to become Imsk's representative, one of the other contestants, Micro, murdered the third finalist, Ion. After she apprehended Micro, Vi was gratefully accepted into the Legion, and despite her chronic shyness, quickly became close friends with the outgoing Kinetix who joined at the same time and who pushed her to become more outgoing. It was shortly after the depowered Kinetix had left on a search for new power artifacts that Violet came across the Emerald Eye of Ekron. Seducing her, it gradually allowed Vi to become more outgoing the way she wished to be to the point where she was elected Legion leader.

Keeping the Eye a secret after the mystically-repowered Kinetix returned (having been sent to search for the Eye) proved deadly. Innocently, she wished that all the Legionnaires would be granted their heart's desires. Unfortunately for Leviathan, his wish was for a heroic death which the Eye promptly arranged. Having had a longstanding crush on him, she was heartbroken by his death, and openly revealed the Eye's power in an attempt to revive him by forcing the Legionnaires to go on a galaxy-wide search for a means of resurrection.

It was only after she had remade the Legion, as well as the Earth, in the Eye's image and several accidentally freed Legionnaires tried to stop her that she realized it had all gone too far; she then commanded the Eye to "turn back time". Maliciously, the Eye took the opportunity to send half the Legion a thousand years into the past, while taking Violet herself into deep space to attempt to continue its brainwashing of its host. There, it sensed its prior master, Mordru (one of the few beings capable of using it against its will) had been reawakened. At this point, Violet and the Eye had merged, with the Eye being the dominant host. This joining was called Veye.

After she was freed from the Eye, and Mordru was defeated, Violet suddenly found herself with Leviathan's powers in addition to her own. Since then, she has alternated between using the codename LeViathan in tribute to him, and simply being known as Violet.

"Threeboot" continuity (2004–2009)

In this continuity, Shrinking Violet is also known as Atom Girl, a myth to all but the founding Legion members. She was considered a joke by the second wave of Legionnaires, until Brainiac 5 revealed her in the battle against Elysion of Terror Firma. She says she was exploring Brainiac 5's microverse and simply lost track of time. Invisible Kid used her name as a cover up to veil his tracks while spying on Brainiac 5.  Subsequently, she assaulted Invisible Kid and after suspending him over the city, forgave him. She seems to quite like the image this gives her of being slightly crazy. She is fiercely loyal to Brainiac 5. Atom Girl overreacts to comments about her size and appears to feel hurt about appearing small in the eyes of the other Legionnaires, and seems unable to handle failure, as her rough facade only hides underlying self-image issues.

Post-Infinite Crisis
The events of the Infinite Crisis miniseries have apparently restored a close analogue of the Pre-Crisis Legion to continuity, as seen in "The Lightning Saga" story arc in Justice League of America and Justice Society of America, and in the "Superman and the Legion of Super-Heroes" story arc in Action Comics.  Shrinking Violet is included in their number.

In this continuity, which is basically a version of the "original" Legion had all of the retcons and manipulation of the timeline not occurred, Shrinking Violet is still at odds with Yera Allon, who joined the Legion as Chameleon Girl. It is revealed that her relationship with Lightning Lass from the Five Year Later gap had been incorporated into the main continuity and they are a lesbian couple.

Powers and abilities
As Shrinking Violet or Violet, Salu Digby has the ability to vary her size. Originally, she can only shrink (down to subatomic sizes, if necessary).  In the Post-Zero Hour reboot, the Emerald Eye bestowed her with Leviathan's power to grow in giant sizes as well. But as Violet, Salu possesses expertise in espionage and unarmed combat.

Equipment
As a member of the Legion of Super-Heroes, she is provided with her own Legion Flight Ring. It allows her to fly in both the vacuum of space and other dangerous environments, and was additionally modified by Brainiac 5 to change size alongside her.

In other media
Shrinking Violet appears in Legion of Super Heroes, voiced by Kari Wahlgren. She is initially a minor character in season 1, but has a more prominent role in season 2. In "Chained Lightning", she uses her skills in transneuralplotonics to build a prosthetic arm for Lightning Lad, and additionally becomes closer to Brainiac 5, though the nature of their relationship is never made clear. In the episode "Message in a Bottle", she is part of a squad who goes to the shrunken bottled city of Kandor to stop Brainiac.

References

External links
Shrinking Violet at Comic Vine

Characters created by Jerry Siegel
Characters created by Jim Mooney
Comics characters introduced in 1961
DC Comics aliens
DC Comics characters who are shapeshifters
DC Comics extraterrestrial superheroes
DC Comics female superheroes
DC Comics LGBT superheroes
Fictional bisexual females
Fictional characters who can change size